Ctenucha nana is a moth of the family Erebidae first described by E. Dukinfield Jones in 1914. It is found in Brazil.

References

nana
Moths described in 1914